In enzymology, a (carboxyethyl)arginine β-lactam-synthase is an enzyme that catalyzes the chemical reaction

ATP + L-N-(2-carboxyethyl)arginine  AMP + diphosphate + deoxyamidinoproclavaminate

Thus, the two substrates of this enzyme are ATP and L-N2-(2-carboxyethyl)arginine, whereas its 3 products are AMP, diphosphate, and deoxyamidinoproclavaminate.

This enzyme belongs to the family of ligases, specifically the cyclo-ligases, which form carbon-nitrogen bonds.  The systematic name of this enzyme class is L-N2-(2-carboxyethyl)arginine cyclo-ligase (AMP-forming). This enzyme is also called L-2-N-(2-carboxyethyl)arginine cyclo-ligase (AMP-forming).  This enzyme participates in clavulanic acid biosynthesis.

References

Further reading
 
 
 

EC 6.3.3
Enzymes of unknown structure